Ji Wallace (born 23 June 1977 in Lismore, Victoria, Australia) is an Australian trampoline gymnast and Olympic silver medalist.

Earlier in his career Wallace won several Australian national titles and made an international breakthrough in 1996 by winning gold in the DMT (double mini trampoline) discipline at the 19th Trampoline World Championships in Vancouver.

In the world championships held in Sydney, he set a world record for completing a jump with the highest degree of difficulty in the DMT, a triple-triple.

He competed at the 2000 Summer Olympics in Sydney, where he received a silver medal in trampoline.

In 2005, he came out publicly as gay, and was the first Australian to be named a Gay Games Ambassador. In an August 2012 letter to the Sydney Star Observer, a gay-oriented weekly tabloid newspaper, he revealed he is HIV-positive.

Wallace returned to his trampoline roots in order to qualify for the Beijing Olympics, but missed Olympic selection at the 2007 World Championships in QC Canada.

Wallace was a cast member with the Cirque du Soleil in their show ZAIA in Macau, China. In October 2008 while performing an acrobatic move, Ji fell badly causing significant injuries; he spent 21 months rehabilitating his right ankle, successfully learning to walk again. In August 2010, he took a coaching job in Montreal at the Cirque du Soleil headquarters but, in 2012, returned to his native Australia, where he is now head coach of Sky School. A trampoline program run by trampoline park chain "Sky Zone".

References

External links
 
 
 

1977 births
Living people
Australian male trampolinists
Gymnasts at the 2000 Summer Olympics
Gay sportsmen
LGBT gymnasts
Australian LGBT sportspeople
Olympic gymnasts of Australia
Olympic medalists in gymnastics
Olympic silver medalists for Australia
People with HIV/AIDS
Cirque du Soleil performers
Medalists at the 2000 Summer Olympics
World Games bronze medalists
Competitors at the 1997 World Games
Medalists at the Trampoline Gymnastics World Championships